Kurochkin Strait is a  wide strait in Russia. It separates Morzhovo Island of the Kamennyye Islands from the mainland, and connects the Kara Sea in the west with the Pyasina Bay in the east.

Straits of the Kara Sea
Straits of Krasnoyarsk Krai